The annual Australian Football League Mark of the Year competition (currently also known as the Four'N Twenty AFL Mark of the Year) is a sporting award that celebrates each season's best mark. A mark is the action of a player cleanly catching a kicked ball that has travelled more than  without the ball hitting the ground.

Originally known as the "VFL Mark of the Year" and selected by a panel of football experts on Network Seven's World of Sport program, the contest was renamed the "AFL Mark of the Year" following the competition's renaming in 1990. Since 2001 it has been run by the AFL. It is open only to players within the AFL and applies to marks taken during official AFL season matches. Several other Australian rules football leagues followed with their own "Mark of the Year" competitions.

A famous VFL footballer, Alex Jesaulenko, unofficially won the first award for a "spectacular mark" during the 1970 VFL Grand Final, a mark that has been frequently called "The Mark of the Century".

Thirty-two players have won the competition; of those, five have won multiple times and six are still active in the AFL. Peter Knights (Hawthorn) and Tony Modra (Adelaide/Fremantle) have won the most Mark of the Year awards, with three each.

The competition is run in conjunction with the Goal of the Year contest, which recognizes the best goal kicked during an AFL season. Two players have won both the "Mark of the Year" and "Goal of the Year" awards in the same season: Michael Mitchell and Peter Bosustow.

Background
Currently also known by its sponsorship name as the "Four'N Twenty AFL Mark of the Year", the competition is open to players in the AFL (Australian rules football's highest league). Winners receive an assortment of prizes, including $5,000 for their grassroots (junior) club, the use of a Toyota Kluger for 12 months and the Alex Jesaulenko Medal.

The current Victorian Football League (formerly known as the Victorian Football Association) runs a similar competition; however, the winners are selected only from the few games that are televised. Many other amateur Australian rules football leagues also run an equivalent competition, but they often rely on less comprehensive television footage; some amateur leagues rely on spectators who submit photos and amateur video recordings to the league, or to television shows such as the AFL Footy Show.

Chris Tarrant's mark in Round 10, 2001, has been used as the basis of the silhouette for the Mark of the Year logo despite ironically losing the Mark of the Year to Gary Moorcroft's Round 14 mark, considered by many to be one of the best marks of all time. Many of the best marks in the VFL/AFL were featured in a VHS/DVD named Miracle Marks.

History
The competition was initiated following Alex Jesaulenko's mark over Graeme "Jerker" Jenkin in the 1970 (Victorian Football League) Grand Final and later recognised officially as the Mark of the Year; the medal awarded to the winner now bears his name. During the 1970s and early 1980s, the award was decided by a panel of football experts on Network Seven's "World of Sport" program and during the 1980s and 1990s, the winning mark was determined by selected football journalists and experts. With minor modifications, the current selection process was first used in the 1998 season. In 1990, the competition (originally known as the VFL Mark of the Year) was renamed the AFL Mark of the Year, following the inception of the AFL.

Selection process
After each round of the regular AFL season, three "mark of the week" nominations are determined by a panel of football experts. The public can then vote for a weekly winner on the AFL website.

After the regular season's end, the title is given to a single mark, which is chosen by the All-Australian selection committee; the public is not given a say in the outcome. The selection committee is not restricted to selecting a winner from the mark of the week winners; indeed, in 2010, the two favourites both came in round 21, and although the public voted Brendon Goddard as mark of the week, the selection panel named Jurrah as Mark of the Year. The winner is announced during grand final week.

Annual winners

AFL Mark of the Year Winners
Key

References

Australian Football League awards
Australian rules football awards
Australian rules football-related lists